Frederick Romberg, (Friedrich Sigismund Hermann Romberg), (21 June 1913, in Tsingtao – 12 November 1992, in Melbourne), was a Swiss-trained architect who migrated to Australia in 1938, and became a leading figure in the development of Modernism in his adopted city.

Romberg was best known as the "middle term" in the architectural partnership of ‘Gromboyd‘ - Grounds, Romberg and Boyd (1953-1962), as well as for some landmark apartment buildings in 1940s Melbourne. He brought an awareness of great European academic tradition, and the Modernist architecture of Switzerland and Germany, re-formed into architecture appropriate to Australia. His buildings are characteristically empiricist in intention and form, using local materials within the formal framework of modernism.

Early life and education

Frederick Romberg, second child of Prussian parents Kurt and Else Romberg, was born on 21 June 1913 in Tsingtao (Qingdao), the principal German colonial possession in China. His father worked in the Colonial Office, after a career as a doctor of law and a judge in Berlin. The family returned to Berlin in September 1913 when Frederick was only a few months old. When WW1 broke out, his father volunteered, and was killed in 1915. In 1920 his mother married a doctor, Hans Riebling, and the family moved to the town of Harburg, adjacent to Hamburg. Here he attended the Stresemann Real-Gymnasium (now the Friedrich-Ebert-Gymnasium), where the principal Walter Schadow, was a supporter of Weimar Republic. As a teenager, he sought out the local avant-garde, like those at the Worpswede artist's colony north of Bremen, where he met Heinrich Vogeler. Here he would have seen architect Bernard Hoetger's Expressionist house, as well as his famous Böttcherstraße development in Bremen. 

After his first studying law at the University of Geneva in Switzerland in 1931, and then at various other Universities, he then swapped in 1933 to the architecture course at the Swiss Federal Institute of Technology (ETH-Zurich), one of the world's leading technical universities. The earlier semesters of the course had a strong component of technical subjects such as mathematics, geometry and building statics. He developed a remarkably consistent and rigorous more fern my cement language of architectural form, employing ribbon windows, cantilevers, roof gardens, open plans and new urban typologies. After graduating from ETH-Zurich, he joined Otto Rudolf Salvisberg’s office as an architectural assistant for 6 months, working mainly on one project, a seven-storey laboratory building in Basel. Completing his studies in 1938, he emigrated to Melbourne that same year, and became a registered architect in 1940. In his professional career from the 1940s to 1960s, he gradually refined his European modernist approach into a local one.

Career

Migration and early practice
To understand the experience of migration is of fundamental importance in understanding the architecture of Fredrick Romberg. While his commitment to Australia was absolute from the moment he arrived, he brought with him memories, knowledge and attitudes that were European in general and German in particular. Arriving in Melbourne at Station Pier, he had an initial, brief visit to Canberra and Sydney, returned to Melbourne, and was immediately engaged by the office of Stephenson and Turner. He was seconded to the design section and worked there for a year. In 1939 he formed a partnership with Mary Turner Shaw, Romberg & Shaw, a pioneering female architect 10 years his senior, who had also worked at Stephenson & Turner, administering various large projects. Together they designed and built a number of pioneering Modernist large-scale apartment buildings, introducing a completely new approach to multi-family dwellings. They include  Newburn Flats (1939-41), and Yarrabee Flats and Glenunga Flats in 1940. They also designed a few houses, combining Modernist and domestic elements. The partnership ended in 1942 as the war made private practice impractical. Romberg then worked in various offices and spent a year interned as an ‘enemy alien’, returning to private practice in 1945 as soon as the war ended, the same year he was naturalised. He already had a very large project in hand, the landmark high-rise Stanhill Flats, designed as early as 1943, and built 1947-1950. The client was businessman and entrepreneur Stanley Korman, who commissioned a number of further schemes from Romberg which mostly came to nothing. One project that did get built was another flat development called Hillstan, on the Nepean Highway in Brighton, built in 1947, two long curving rows of two storey blocks joined by glazed stairwells.

Grounds, Romberg and Boyd: 1953-1962
In 1951 Romberg's practice was in a precarious position. He had moved his office from La Trobe Street in 1949 to the front flat on the top floor of Newburn and the following year into a penthouse created from the roof garden. With his partners Roy Grounds and Robin Boyd, Romberg continued to explore local idioms in his schools, colleges and churches and to link his work to historical precedent in Australia. At the same time, he excavated his own past, resurrecting its latent classicism in order to affirm Australia's earliest, and particularly Palladian, traditions.

Architecture style: The Central Plan
Romberg's complex and varied approach to the central plan suggests a secure grounding in historical precedent (a subject he taught at RMIT in the late 1940s) and possibly some knowledge of the immensely influential text by Rudolf Wittkower, Architectural Principles in the Age of Humanism, first published in 1949 which dealt with both Palladian geometry and the central plan.

Architecture style: Brutalism
The relationship of Romberg's work to be emerging Brutalist movement in England is one of the more intriguing aspects of his practice during the 1950s and early 1960s. Brutalism in Australia is generally understood as a style of ‘rational and robust’ concrete architecture, largely institutional, widespread in the 1960s and 1970s. Its forms derived from Le Corbusier’s later work and the Japanese new architecture.

The breakup of the partnership: Romberg and Boyd: 1962-1975
During the National Gallery of Victoria and Cultural Centre project, where the practice of Grounds, Romberg and Boyd was appointed as the architects; at a more personal level, it caused the breakup of the partnership. To some extent, Romberg believed the building would have been much more significant with the teamwork and contribution of three.

University of Newcastle, NSW
In 1965 Romberg was appointed the foundation Professor of Architecture at the University of Newcastle, north of Sydney and he held this position for the following decade.

Return to Melbourne
Romberg returned to Melbourne in 1975 where he carried on a small practice into the 1980s.

He died at his home in East Melbourne in November 1992.

Key building and projects

Stanhill Flats

34 Queens Road, South Melbourne, Victoria; designed in 1943, built 1947-1950

The name Stanhill was first coined by Romberg as a combination of the names of the two brothers Stanley and Hilel Korman. It is a strong building with a powerful silhouette that responds positively to its urban context—— multi-storied urban housing which is both eligible as dwelling and as modernist monument. The idea of a penthouse on the roof of the tall building was put forward at this time. The building was initially arranged in four vertical stacks containing 4,5,6,8 flats; the genesis of the present building. However, the scheme of the building has been changed three times due to the changes of local building regulations. Although Stanhill was no longer an advanced design by the time it was completed, it is one of the works by which Romberg is now best known.

Newburn Flats
30 Queens Road, South Melbourne, 1939-41

The 26-year-old Romberg had been in Melbourne for little more than a year when he embarked on Newburn project. It was his first reinforced concrete multi—storey residential building. There are four storeys of twenty-four flats, with the living spaces on the sunny north side, each with an angled window bay and balcony so as to obtain a view towards Queens Road and park beyond. Stair towers at each end connect with access balconies on the south side. Romberg used the technology he was familiar with from his time in Salvisberg's office, reinforced concrete.

Picken Court, Ormond College
College Crescent, Parkville, 1959

Picken Court is designed to be a student and staff facility comprising three octagonal building linked together at each of their three storeys by semi-enclosed bridges. Each had a radial plan with a light and ventilation shaft at its centre, a ring of toilets, laundries and other utilities, a passageway and students’ rooms, and common study areas around the perimeter. Picken Court was a rare fusion of a 19th-century form and contemporary ideas that elucidated the common theoretical bonds between the two.

ETA Foods Factory
254 Ballarat Road, Braybrook, 1957

ETA factory was designed for a client, Nut Foods, for the iricution if their ETA brand margarine. 
With its elegant, extremely long curtain wall presenting as the public façade, it was one of the most distinguished industrial buildings of the post-war period.
At ETA, of interest is the handling of the curtain wall fronting Ballarat Road with its alternating bands of clear and black glass, tubular steel diagonal members (originally picked out in gold matte paint) and classical colonnade implied in the regular rhythm of expressed structural steel columns. Abandoned for many years, only part of the curtain wall facade and the entry courtyard area was retained when the majority of the factory space was replaced by a ‘big box’ retail building and carpark. Despite these changes, it is still considered one of the best post-war factories built in Victoria.

List of works

 Newburn Flats, 30 Queens Road, South Melbourne - 1939
 Yarrabee Flats, South Yarra, Victoria - 1940
 Glenunga Flats, Armadale, Victoria - 1940
 Romberg House, Eaglemont, Victoria - 1941
 St Quentin, Ellery House, Upwey, Victoria – 1941
 Miller-Short House, Upper Mast Road, Upwey - 1947
 Hilstan Flats, corner Nepean Highway and Marriage Road, Brighton, Victoria – 1947 (demolished)
 Stanhill, 34 Queens Road, South Melbourne - designed 1943, built 1947-50
 Yarralands Flats, Hawthorn, Victoria - 1951
 Lutheran Church Hall, South Melbourne, Victoria - 1953 (demolished)
 Sacred Heart Girls' College building, Oakleigh, Victoria - 1954
 Harris Flats, Barkers Road, Hawthorn - 1955
 Bruck House, Bruck Mills, Wangaratta, Victoria - 1955 
 ICI Staff Recreation Centre, Deer Park, Victoria – 1955 (demolished)
 ETA Foods Factory, 254 Ballarat Road, Braybrook - 1957
 CSIRO - Division of Protein Chemistry, Parkville, Victoria - 1958
 Picken Court, Ormond College, Parkville - 1959
 Holy Trinity Lutheran Church, Canberra – 1960 
 St George's Anglican, East Ivanhoe - 1962
 MacFarland Library, and School of Microbiology of University of Melbourne - 1962
 Luther College, Croydon - 1963
 School of Architecture, University of Newcastle, New South Wales - 1968
 Newcastle City Council Offices, King Street, Newcastle, New South Wales - designed 1970, built 1972-77

Awards
 Inaugural President's prize, awarded by Victorian Chapter of the Royal Australian Institute of Architects
 In 2006, after he died, National Architecture 2006 : National 25 Year Award – Robin Boyd House II, one of his building works was awarded by Royal Australian Institute of Architects

References

 Harriet Edquist (ed.), Frederick Romberg : Architecture of Migration 1938–1975, RMIT Publishing, Melbourne, 2000.
 Leslie Body & Stephen Jeffries (eds.) 1986, The German Connecting : Sesquicentennial Essays on German-Victorian Crosscurrents in Victoria, Allen and Unwin, Sydney, 1986.
 Frederick Romberg, Before Gromboyd : An Architectural History, typewritten manuscript, 1986.
 Philip Goad, Collusions of Modernity : Australian Pavilions in New York and Wellington 1939, Fabrications, 1999.
 Jennifer Taylor, Australian Architecture since 1960, Law Book Company, Sydney, 1986.
 Kenneth Frampton, Modern Architecture : A Critical History, Thames and Hudson, London, 1980.
 Frederick Romberg, David L.Smith, The decline of the environment, Cassell Australia, Melbourne, 1973.

External links

 Modern in Melbourne 1 : Melbourne Architecture 1930-50, Frederick Romberg 
 Frederick Romberg Collection at RMIT Design Archives

Modernist architects
Modernist architecture in Australia
1913 births
1992 deaths
ETH Zurich alumni
20th-century Australian architects
German expatriates in China
German expatriates in Switzerland
German emigrants to Australia